Festival of Family Classics is a Rankin/Bass animated anthology series that originally aired between 1972 and 1973. The show originally aired in syndication. It was re-aired 1 November 2005 on the Boomerang channel and on 16 June 2011 via the Teletoon Retro network.

Festival of Family Classics is a series of television versions of famous folk tales and classic literature. 16 of the 18 episodes were 20 minutes long. The two 40 minutes-long episodes (20,000 Leagues Under the Sea and Around the World in 80 Days) were split into two-parters, making 20 episodes in total. The episodes were animated by two Japanese animation studios: Mushi Production and Topcraft.

Videos have been distributed by several companies, including Prism Entertainment, Anchor Bay Entertainment's Starmaker Video, EBM Group, and Classic Media (now known as DreamWorks Classics due to purchase from DreamWorks Animation in 2012). 12 episodes (including the two-parters as single episodes) have been released on DVD.

A similar series, Famous Classic Tales, aired on CBS from 1970 to 1984.

List of episodes

Voices
 Carl Banas
 Len Birman
 Bernard Cowan
 Peg Dixon
 Keith Hampshire
 Peggi Loder
 Donna Miller
 Frank Perry
 Henry Raymer
 Billie Mae Richards
 Alfie Scopp
 Paul Soles

Home media
On VHS:
 Alice in Wonderland (Starmaker Entertainment 1989(US)), (Futurevision Ltd. 1986(UK)), (Prism Entertainment 1986(US))
 Sleeping Beauty (Starmaker Entertainment 1989)(us)
 Snövit och De Sju Dvärgarna (Snow White and the Seven Dwarfs) (SWE-Ayamonte AB)
 Tom Sawyer (SWE-Ayamonte AB-1995)

Classic Media released 10 episodes on 4 DVDs in between 2006–2007.
 The Princess Collection (Snow White and the Seven Dwarfs, Cinderella, The Sleeping Beauty, Alice in Wonderland)
 Classic Adventures Volume 1 (Around the World in 80 Days, 20,000 Leagues Under the Sea)
 Classic Adventures Volume 2 (The Arabian Nights, Robin Hood)
 Classic Adventures Volume 3 (Swiss Family Robinson, Robinson Crusoe)

The 2002 DVD release of Here Comes Peter Cottontail features the "Puss in Boots" episode, and the Mad Mad Mad Monsters DVD includes the "Jack O' Lantern" episode.

References

External links
 
 

1970s American animated television series
1970s American anthology television series
1972 American television series debuts
1973 American television series endings
American children's animated action television series
American children's animated adventure television series
American children's animated anthology television series
American children's animated fantasy television series
English-language television shows
Rankin/Bass Productions television series
Topcraft
Television shows based on novels
Television shows based on fairy tales